Korwa may refer to:
 Korwa language
 Korwa people
 Korwa, Uttar Pradesh